Wokingham Borough Council is the local authority for the Borough of Wokingham, a unitary authority in Berkshire, England. Until 1 April 1998 it was a non-metropolitan district.

Political control
Since the first election to the council in 1973 political control of the council has been held by the following parties:

Non-metropolitan district

Unitary authority

Leadership
Since 1995, the leaders of the council have been:

Council elections

Non-metropolitan district elections
1973 Wokingham District Council election
1976 Wokingham District Council election
1979 Wokingham District Council election (New ward boundaries)
1980 Wokingham District Council election
1982 Wokingham District Council election
1983 Wokingham District Council election
1984 Wokingham District Council election
1986 Wokingham District Council election
1987 Wokingham District Council election
1988 Wokingham District Council election
1990 Wokingham District Council election
1991 Wokingham District Council election (District boundary changes took place but the number of seats remained the same)
1992 Wokingham District Council election
1994 Wokingham District Council election
1995 Wokingham District Council election
1996 Wokingham District Council election

Unitary authority elections
1997 Wokingham District Council election
1999 Wokingham District Council election
2000 Wokingham District Council election
2001 Wokingham District Council election
2002 Wokingham District Council election
2003 Wokingham District Council election
2004 Wokingham District Council election (New ward boundaries)
2006 Wokingham District Council election
2007 Wokingham District Council election
2008 Wokingham Borough Council election
2010 Wokingham Borough Council election
2011 Wokingham Borough Council election
2012 Wokingham Borough Council election
2014 Wokingham Borough Council election
2015 Wokingham Borough Council election
2016 Wokingham Borough Council election
2018 Wokingham Borough Council election
2019 Wokingham Borough Council election
2021 Wokingham Borough Council election
2022 Wokingham Borough Council election

Borough result maps

By-election results

1997–2005

2005–2009

2009–2013

2013–present

References

External links
Wokingham District Council
By-election results

 
Council elections in Berkshire
Unitary authority elections in England